Ted van der Parre (born 21 September 1955) is a former strongman from the Netherlands, who won the World's Strongest Man contest in 1992 and was 4th in 1991. He also participated in 1994 when he finished 8th, having to drop out after the second event due to a calf injury. He also won the Netherlands Strongest Man contest in 1991, 1992, and 1994.

Honours
1st place Sterkste Man van Nederland (1991)
4th place World's Strongest Man  (1991)
1st place Sterkste Man van Nederland (1992)
1st place World's Strongest Man  (1992)
1st place Sterkste Man van Nederland (1994)
8th place World's Strongest Man  (1994) (injured)

References

1955 births
Living people
Dutch strength athletes
Sportspeople from Amsterdam